In Greek mythology, Ithome (Ancient Greek: Ἰθώμη) was a Messenian nymph and one of the nurses of the child Zeus.

Mythology 
Ithome and Neda brought up and bathed the infant Zeus after he was stolen by the Curetes owing to the danger that threatened from his father. These nymphs gave their name to the mountain Ithome and the river Neda.

Note

References 

 Pausanias, Description of Greece with an English Translation by W.H.S. Jones, Litt.D., and H.A. Ormerod, M.A., in 4 Volumes. Cambridge, MA, Harvard University Press; London, William Heinemann Ltd. 1918. . Online version at the Perseus Digital Library
 Pausanias, Graeciae Descriptio. 3 vols. Leipzig, Teubner. 1903. Greek text available at the Perseus Digital Library.

Nymphs